Dawn Driscoll is an American politician and farmer serving as a member of the Iowa Senate from the 46th district. Elected in November 2020, she assumed office on January 11, 2021.

Early life and education 
Driscoll was born in Annawan, Illinois. She earned a Bachelor of Science degree in agronomy from Western Illinois University.

Career 
A sixth-generation farmer, Driscoll has previously worked as a recruiter for Hummer AgriBusiness Search. She was also the president of the Iowa County, Iowa Farm Bureau. Driscoll was elected to the Iowa Senate in November 2020 and assumed office on January 11, 2021. Driscoll is the vice chair of the Senate Natural Resources and Environment Committee.

References 

Farmers from Iowa
Republican Party Iowa state senators
Western Illinois University alumni
People from Henry County, Illinois
Year of birth missing (living people)
Living people
Women state legislators in Iowa